Rob Sutherland (born 16 June 1985) is a former Welsh male squash player. He was part of the 2009 PSA World Tour competing in the 2009 Men's World Team Squash Championships. He achieved his highest career ranking of 67 in December 2009.

References 

1985 births
Living people
Welsh male squash players
Sportspeople from Newport, Wales